Little Johnny Jones is a musical by George M. Cohan.  The show introduced Cohan's tunes "Give My Regards to Broadway" and "The Yankee Doodle Boy." The "Yankee Doodle" character was inspired by real-life  Hall of Fame jockey Tod Sloan.

Background
The show was Cohan's first full-length musical.  A famous American jockey, Tod Sloan, had gone to England in 1903 to ride in the Derby for King Edward VII of England.  This gave Cohan the idea for the story.  The musical is patriotic in tone and contains a number of quips aimed at European targets, such as, "You think I'd marry an heiress and live off her money? What do you take me for? An Englishman?"  and, "French pastry ain't worth 30¢ compared to American apple pie."  In Little Johnny Jones Cohan introduced some of the dance steps and comedy features for which he would become famous.

This musical is also credited as being the first American Musical, along "with The Black Crook, Evangeline, Show Boat" ... or any number of other works."  (The Black Crook (1866) is considered a prototype of the modern musical in that its popular songs and dances are interspersed throughout a unifying play and performed by the actors.)

Synopsis
A brash, patriotic American jockey, Johnny Jones, goes to England to ride his horse, Yankee Doodle, in the English Derby.  Jones falls in love with Goldie Gates, a San Francisco copper heiress, who follows him to Britain, disguising herself as a man to discover if Jones really loves her.  Anthony Anstey, an American who runs a Chinese gambling establishment in San Francisco, offers Jones a bribe to lose the race deliberately, but he refuses.  After Jones loses, Anstey spreads rumors that he threw the race intentionally.  Jones' detective, pretending to be a drunkard, searches for evidence to clear Johnny's name and finds out that it was Anstey that framed Jones.  Jones tells his friends who are returning to America, "Give My Regards to Broadway," but he stays in London to try to regain his reputation.  Jones returns to America with his name cleared, eager to propose marriage to Goldie, but he finds that Anstey has kidnapped her.  He and his detective search for her in San Francisco's Chinatown, eventually finding her.

Original production
The musical was first tried out at the Parsons Theatre in Hartford, Connecticut in October 1904 and then opened on Broadway at the Liberty Theatre on November 7, 1904.  The original production was produced by Sam H. Harris and directed by George M. Cohan who also performed as part of the cast with the other members of The Four Cohans (Cohan, his parents and sister).  Ethel Levey, Cohan's wife, co-starred.  Among the other performers were William Seymour and Donald Brian.  The Broadway run of only 52 performances was followed by tours, during which some rewrites were made.  It was revived twice in 1905 at the New York Theatre, playing successfully for over 200 performances through most of that year, and touring until the next Broadway revival in 1907 for a short run at the Academy of Music.  The production was mounted with a huge cast.

Subsequent adaptations and productions
Little Johnny Jones was adapted twice for the motion pictures, first as a silent film released in 1923 by Warner Bros. First National followed this in 1929 with an early talkie musical version directed by Mervyn LeRoy, who played a bit part in the 1923 film. Eddie Buzzell, who co-wrote the screenplay with Adelaide Heilbron, played the title role.  Only two of Cohan's original songs survived the transition to the screen ("Give My Regards To Broadway" and "Yankee Doodle Boy").  The five other tunes in the film's score were contributed by various other songwriters, mainly Herb Magidson and Michael H. Cleary.

James Cagney appeared in a play-within-a-play staging of numbers and dances from Little Johnny Jones in the 1942 film, Yankee Doodle Dandy.

David Cassidy starred in a touring revival in 1981. After previewing at Connecticut's Goodspeed Opera House and touring, a 1982 revival, adapted by Alfred Uhry and starring Donny Osmond in the lead closed at the Alvin Theatre after only one performance.

An adaptation of the show was produced by the Light Opera of Manhattan in the late 1980s, called Give My Regards to Broadway and was successful for that company.

Song list

The Cecil in London - Jenkins
They're All My Friends - Timothy D. McGee
Mam'selle Fauchette - Goldie Gates
'Op in the 'Ansom - Cabbies and Reformers
Nesting in a New York Tree - Florabelle Fly
The Yankee Doodle Boy - Johnny Jones
Off to the Derby - Company
Girls from the U.S.A. - Florabelle Fly
Sailors of St. Hurrah - Sailors
Captain of a Ten Day Boat - Captain Squirvy
Goodbye Flo - Goldie Gates
Good Old California - Henry Hapgood
A Girl I Know - Johnny Jones and Goldie Gates
Give My Regards to Broadway - Johnny Jones
March of the Frisco Chinks - Company
Life's a Funny Proposition - Johnny Jones

References

Footnotes

Bibliography
Cohan, George M. Twenty Years on Broadway. New York: Harper & Brothers, 1924.
Gilbert, Douglas. American Vaudeville: Its Life and Times. New York: Dover Publications, 1963.
Jones, John Bush. Our Musicals, Ourselves: A Social History of the American Musical Theatre. Lebanon, NH: Brandeis University Press, 2003. (pp. 15–23).
McCabe, John. George M. Cohan: The Man Who Owned Broadway. New York: Doubleday & Co., 1973.
Morehouse, Ward. George M. Cohan: Prince of the American Theater. Philadelphia: J.B. Lippencott, 1943.

External links
 
Compete Book and Lyrics to LITTLE JOHNNY JONES
Links to images associated with the show
Pamphlet from the original production from the New York Public Library
Images to sheet music from the show

1904 musicals
Broadway musicals
Musicals by George M. Cohan